The Rose Tint is the second solo studio album by New Zealand rapper David Dallas. It was released as a free download on 11 May 2011 through Dawn Raid Entertainment/Dirty Management/Duck Down Music. Production was handled by Fire & Ice, Dan "Exile" Mawby, Nick "41" Maclaren, P-Money and M-Phazes. It features guest appearances from Che Fu, Freddie Gibbs, Jordache, Pieter T, PNC and Buckshot. The album peaked at number 3 on the Official New Zealand Music Chart.

Due to the album, Dallas won 'Best Pacific Male Artist' at the 2012 Pacific Music Awards. Both the artist and the album were also nominated for 'Album of the Year', 'Best Male Solo Artist' and 'Best Urban/Hip Hop Album' at the 2011 New Zealand Music Awards, 'Best Pacific Urban Artist' at 2012 Pacific Music Awards, and shortlisted for the 2012 Taite Music Prize. This was considered an impressive feat for a project released as a free download.

Its lead single "Take a Picture" was nominated for 'APRA Best Pacific Song' at 2012 Pacific Music Awards and for 'Best Music Video' at 2012 New Zealand Music Awards.

Release 
The album was available for free download on the Internet on 5 May 2011 via DatPiff and appeared on Dallas' official website on 11 May 2011. Dallas said he wanted to give his album away for free stating: "That's ultimately what you need, you want people to hear it. You think, would you rather a thousand people heard it or would you rather sell it to one hundred?". The album was downloaded more than 8,000 times within its first 24 hours, and by November 2011 it has been downloaded 50,000+ times. Physical edition of the album was announced by Dallas on his website explaining the reason behind the decision:

The Rose Tint: Deluxe Edition was released on 8 November 2011 in North America and 14 November 2011 in New Zealand and Australia. It contains four Fire & Ice-produced extra songs: "Feel Like Oasis", which features Kid Daytonna & Tayyib Ali, "Not Enough", which features Jordache, "10 Foot Tall" and "Couldn't Walk a Mile", replaces the track "Til Tomorrow" with a remix by M-Phazes, and also includes an instrumental disc of all the original tracks of The Rose Tint except "Til Tomorrow" (and "Ain't Coming Down", which is presented as a bonus track on the standard edition), with Dallas saying that the instrumental disc "is for the aspiring artists or anyone who just loved the beats".

Track listing

Notes
 There are two versions of the album's seventh track: the original version of "Til' Tomorrow" and M-Phazes-produced and version "Til' Tomorrow (Remix)". One version replaces the other on different editions.

Sample credits
Track 3 contains an interpolation from "Saturate" written by Thomas Rowlands and Edmund Simons and performed by The Chemical Brothers.

Charts

Release history

References

External links

2011 albums
David Dallas albums
Duck Down Music albums
Albums produced by P-Money
Albums free for download by copyright owner